Edward Witten (born August 26, 1951) is an American mathematical and theoretical physicist. He is a Professor Emeritus in the School of Natural Sciences at the Institute for Advanced Study in Princeton. Witten is a researcher in string theory, quantum gravity, supersymmetric quantum field theories, and other areas of mathematical physics. Witten's work has also significantly impacted pure mathematics. In 1990, he became the first physicist to be awarded a Fields Medal by the International Mathematical Union, for his mathematical insights in physics, such as his 1981 proof of the positive energy theorem in general relativity, and his interpretation of the Jones invariants of knots as Feynman integrals. He is considered the practical founder of M-theory.

Early life and education
Witten was born on August 26, 1951, in Baltimore, Maryland, to a Jewish family. He is the son of Lorraine (née Wollach) Witten and Louis Witten, a theoretical physicist specializing in gravitation and general relativity.

Witten attended the Park School of Baltimore (class of '68), and received his Bachelor of Arts degree with a major in history and minor in linguistics from Brandeis University in 1971.

He had aspirations in journalism and politics and published articles in both The New Republic and The Nation in the late 1960s. In 1972 he worked for six months on George McGovern's presidential campaign.

Witten attended the University of Michigan for one semester as an economics graduate student before dropping out. He returned to academia, enrolling in applied mathematics at Princeton University in 1973, then shifting departments and receiving a PhD in physics in 1976 and completing a dissertation, "Some problems in the short distance analysis of gauge theories", under the supervision of David Gross. He held a fellowship at Harvard University (1976–77), visited Oxford University (1977–78), was a junior fellow in the Harvard Society of Fellows (1977–1980), and held a MacArthur Foundation fellowship (1982).

Research

Fields medal work
Witten was awarded the Fields Medal by the International Mathematical Union in 1990.

In a written address to the ICM, Michael Atiyah said of Witten:

As an example of Witten's work in pure mathematics, Atiyah cites his application of techniques from quantum field theory to the mathematical subject of low-dimensional topology. In the late 1980s, Witten coined the term topological quantum field theory for a certain type of physical theory in which the expectation values of observable quantities encode information about the topology of spacetime. In particular, Witten realized that a physical theory now called Chern–Simons theory could provide a framework for understanding the mathematical theory of knots and 3-manifolds. Although Witten's work was based on the mathematically ill-defined notion of a Feynman path integral and therefore not mathematically rigorous, mathematicians were able to systematically develop Witten's ideas, leading to the theory of Reshetikhin–Turaev invariants.

Another result for which Witten was awarded the Fields Medal was his proof in 1981 of the positive energy theorem in general relativity. This theorem asserts that (under appropriate assumptions) the total energy of a gravitating system is always positive and can be zero only if the geometry of spacetime is that of flat Minkowski space. It establishes Minkowski space as a stable ground state of the gravitational field. While the original proof of this result due to Richard Schoen and Shing-Tung Yau used variational methods, Witten's proof used ideas from supergravity theory to simplify the argument.

A third area mentioned in Atiyah's address is Witten's work relating supersymmetry and Morse theory, a branch of mathematics that studies the topology of manifolds using the concept of a differentiable function. Witten's work gave a physical proof of a classical result, the Morse inequalities, by interpreting the theory in terms of supersymmetric quantum mechanics.

M-theory
By the mid 1990s, physicists working on string theory had developed five different consistent versions of the theory. These versions are known as type I, type IIA, type IIB, and the two flavors of heterotic string theory (SO(32) and E8×E8). The thinking was that of these five candidate theories, only one was the actual correct theory of everything, and that theory was the one whose low-energy limit matched the physics observed in our world today.

Speaking at the string theory conference at University of Southern California in 1995, Witten made the surprising suggestion that these five string theories were in fact not distinct theories, but different limits of a single theory, which he called M-theory. Witten's proposal was based on the observation that the five string theories can be mapped to one another by certain rules called dualities and are identified by these dualities. It led to a flurry of work now known as the second superstring revolution.

Other work

Another of Witten's contributions to physics was to the result of gauge/gravity duality. In 1997, Juan Maldacena formulated a result known as the AdS/CFT correspondence, which establishes a relationship between certain quantum field theories and theories of quantum gravity. Maldacena's discovery has dominated high-energy theoretical physics for the past 15 years because of its applications to theoretical problems in quantum gravity and quantum field theory. Witten's foundational work following Maldacena's result has shed light on this relationship.

In collaboration with Nathan Seiberg, Witten established several powerful results in quantum field theories. In their paper on string theory and noncommutative geometry, Seiberg and Witten studied certain noncommutative quantum field theories that arise as limits of string theory. In another well-known paper, they studied aspects of supersymmetric gauge theory. The latter paper, combined with Witten's earlier work on topological quantum field theory, led to developments in the topology of smooth 4-manifolds, in particular the notion of Seiberg–Witten invariants.

With Anton Kapustin, Witten has made deep mathematical connections between S-duality of gauge theories and the geometric Langlands correspondence. Partly in collaboration with Seiberg, one of his recent interests include aspects of field theoretical description of topological phases in condensed matter and non-supersymmetric dualities in field theories that, among other things, are of high relevance in condensed matter theory. In 2016, he has also brought tensor models to the relevance of holographic and quantum gravity theories, by using them as a generalization of the Sachdev–Ye–Kitaev model.

Witten has published influential and insightful work in many aspects of quantum field theories and mathematical physics, including the physics and mathematics of anomalies, integrability, dualities, localization, and homologies. Many of his results have deeply influenced areas in theoretical physics (often well beyond the original context of his results), including string theory, quantum gravity and topological condensed matter.

Awards and honors
Witten has been honored with numerous awards including a MacArthur Grant (1982), the Fields Medal (1990), the Golden Plate Award of the American Academy of Achievement (1997), the Nemmers Prize in Mathematics (2000), the National Medal of Science (2002), Pythagoras Award (2005), the Henri Poincaré Prize (2006), the Crafoord Prize (2008), the Lorentz Medal (2010) the Isaac Newton Medal (2010) and the Fundamental Physics Prize (2012). Since 1999, he has been a Foreign Member of the Royal Society (London), and in March 2016 was elected an Honorary Fellow of the Royal Society of Edinburgh. Pope Benedict XVI appointed Witten as a member of the Pontifical Academy of Sciences (2006). He also appeared in the list of Time magazine's 100 most influential people of 2004. In 2012 he became a fellow of the American Mathematical Society. Witten was elected as a member of the American Academy of Arts and Sciences in 1984, a member of the National Academy of Sciences in 1988, and a member of the American Philosophical Society in 1993. In May 2022 he was awarded an honorary Doctor of Sciences from the University of Pennsylvania.

In an informal poll at a 1990 cosmology conference, Witten received the largest number of mentions as "the smartest living physicist".

Personal life
Witten has been married to Chiara Nappi, a professor of physics at Princeton University, since 1979. They have two daughters and a son. Their daughter Ilana B. Witten is a neuroscientist at Princeton University, and daughter Daniela Witten is a biostatistician at the University of Washington.

Witten sits on the board of directors of Americans for Peace Now and on the advisory council of J Street. He supports the two-state solution and advocates a boycott of Israeli institutions and economic activity beyond its 1967 borders, though not of Israel itself.

Selected publications
 Some Problems in the Short Distance Analysis of Gauge Theories. Princeton University, 1976. (Dissertation.)
 Roman Jackiw, David Gross, Sam B. Treiman, Edward Witten, Bruno Zumino. Current Algebra and Anomalies: A Set of Lecture Notes and Papers. World Scientific, 1985.
 Green, M., John H. Schwarz, and E. Witten. Superstring Theory. Vol. 1, Introduction. Cambridge Monographs on Mathematical Physics. Cambridge, UK: Cambridge University Press, 1988. .
 Green, M., John H. Schwarz, and E. Witten. Superstring Theory. Vol. 2, Loop Amplitudes, Anomalies and Phenomenology. Cambridge, UK: Cambridge University Press, 1988. .
 Quantum fields and strings: a course for mathematicians. Vols. 1, 2. Material from the Special Year on Quantum Field Theory held at the Institute for Advanced Study, Princeton, NJ, 1996–1997. Edited by Pierre Deligne, Pavel Etingof, Daniel S. Freed, Lisa C. Jeffrey, David Kazhdan, John W. Morgan, David R. Morrison and Edward Witten. American Mathematical Society, Providence, RI; Institute for Advanced Study (IAS), Princeton, NJ, 1999. Vol. 1: xxii+723 pp.; Vol. 2: pp. i–xxiv and 727–1501. , 81–06 (81T30 81Txx).

References

External links

 Faculty webpage
 Publications on ArXiv
 
 
 A Physicist's Physicist Ponders the Nature of Reality, Interview with Nathalie Wolchover in Quanta Magazine, November 28, 2017

1951 births
20th-century American physicists
21st-century American physicists
Albert Einstein Medal recipients
Albert Einstein World Award of Science Laureates
Brandeis University alumni
Clay Research Award recipients
Fellows of the American Academy of Arts and Sciences
Fellows of the American Mathematical Society
Fellows of the American Physical Society
Fields Medalists
Foreign Members of the Royal Society
Harvard Fellows
Institute for Advanced Study faculty
Jewish American scientists
Jewish physicists
Kyoto laureates in Basic Sciences
Living people
MacArthur Fellows
Mathematical physicists
Members of the French Academy of Sciences
Members of the Pontifical Academy of Sciences
Members of the United States National Academy of Sciences
National Medal of Science laureates
Lorentz Medal winners
Park School of Baltimore alumni
Princeton University alumni
Princeton University faculty
Scientists from Baltimore
American string theorists
Fellows of the Royal Society of Edinburgh
Members of the American Philosophical Society